Jefferson Street may refer to:

 Jefferson Street (Nashville), Tennessee
 Jefferson Street (Savannah, Georgia)
 Jefferson Street Cemetery, in Ellicottville, New York
 Jefferson Street Grounds, a defunct baseball field in Philadelphia, Pennsylvania
 Jefferson Street Historic District (disambiguation)
 Jefferson Street station, of the New York City Subway